Norilsk Railway is a single-track railway and formerly the northernmost railway line in Russia.

Main information
The railway is in northern Krasnoyarsk Krai, southern Taimyr Peninsula and connects the mining towns Talnakh, Norilsk and Kayerkan with the port Dudinka on the Yenisei. Originally, it was  narrow gauge, 114 km long, and built in 1936. Later, in 1953, it was rebuilt to Russian broad gauge and expanded to 231 km of track. The railway is owned by the Norilsk Nickel mining company and does not belong to Russian Railways.

From 1957 onwards, the railway was electrified with 3kV DC in stages. Electrical Multiple Units of the ER1 and ER2 series were used for suburban passenger transportation. VL10 locomotives were used to haul heavy freight trains on the railway.

In the 1990s, the railway was in serious decline. In 1998 the electric catenary was removed and the electric rolling stock sold off.
Diesel locomotives haul freight trains since then, passenger service on the railway was discontinued.

In the early 1990s, a paved highway connecting Norilsk with Dudinka was completed. The passenger train service on the Norilsk Line ended in 1998.

In 2010 in the Yamal Peninsula, Gazprom completed its Obskaya–Bovanenkovo Line, which is now the northernmost railway in Russia.

See also

 Salekhard–Igarka Railway

External links
 Norilsk railway on Sergey Bolashenko's railway site (Russian)
 Trip to the Norilsk railway and photos (Russian)

Norilsk
Railway lines in Russia
Track
Rail transport in Krasnoyarsk Krai
1520 mm gauge railways in Russia
Metre gauge railways in Russia